Irek (İrek) is a rural locality (a village) in Arslanovsky Selsoviet, Chishminsky District, Bashkortostan, Russia. The population was 125 as of 2010. There is 1 street.

Geography 
Irek is located 5 km north of Chishmy (the district's administrative centre) by road. Chishmy is the nearest rural locality.

References 

Rural localities in Chishminsky District